AFI Awards may refer to:

 American Film Institute Awards
 Australian Film Institute Awards, the precursor of the AACTA Awards